Jean François Foppens, sometimes Latinized Johannes Franciscus Foppens (1689–1761), was a Belgian ecclesiastical historian, and literary biographer and bibliographer. He is best known for his Bibliotheca belgica, sive virorum in Belgio vita scriptisque illustrium catalogus (2 vols., Brussels, 1739), a catalogue of Belgian authors and their works.

Life
Foppens was born in Brussels on 17 November 1689, the son of a family of printers. He was sent to Leuven University in 1704 and graduated Master of Arts in 1706, at the age of 17. Around 1713 he began lecturing on Philosophy at the university while studying Theology. In 1715 he graduated Licentiate of Theology and began a clerical career, holding a canonry of the church of St Martin in Aalst, then St. Salvator's Cathedral in Bruges, and finally St. Rumbold's Cathedral in Mechelen. He died in Mechelen on 16 July 1761 and was buried in the cathedral.

Works
 Historia episcopatus Antverpiensis (Brussels, 1717)
 Historia episcopatus Sylvaeducensis (Brussels, 1721)
 Auberti Miraei opera diplomatica et historica (4 vols., Brussels, 1723–1748)
 Bibliotheca belgica, sive virorum in Belgio vita scriptisque illustrium catalogus (2 vols., Brussels, 1739)
 Basilica Bruxellensis (Mechelen, 1743)

References

1689 births
1761 deaths
Old University of Leuven alumni
18th-century historians from the Holy Roman Empire
18th-century biographers
Roman Catholic priests of the Austrian Netherlands
Historians of the Catholic Church
Writers of the Austrian Netherlands